Julianne Dalcanton (born 1968) is an American astronomer, professor of astronomy, researcher and comet discoverer. Since September 2021 she is the director of the Simons Foundation Center for Computational Astrophysics.

Career 
Julianne Dalcanton joined the Simons Foundation in September 2021 as Director of the Flatiron Institute’s Center for Computational Astrophysics (CCA) in NYC. Prior to this she was Professor of Astronomy, University of Washington, Chair of the Astronomy Department, and researcher for Sloan Digital Sky Survey. Her main work is on the area of galaxy formation and evolution.  She led the ACS Nearby Galaxy Survey Treasury (ANGST) and is leading the Panchromatic Hubble Andromeda Treasury (PHAT) programs on the Hubble Space Telescope. She became known worldwide by her discovery of the comet C/1999 F2 Dalcanton.  She is also a contributor to the physics blog Cosmic Variance.

Awards and honors 
In 2018, Professor Dalcanton was awarded the Beatrice M. Tinsley Prize by the American Astronomical Society in recognition of her work in Astronomy and "contributions that are of an exceptionally creative or innovative character and that have played a seminal role in furthering our understanding of the universe." Asteroid 148384 Dalcanton, discovered by the Sloan Digital Sky Survey in 2000, was named in her honor. The official  was published by the Minor Planet Center on 6 April 2012.

Journal articles

References

External links 
 https://www.simonsfoundation.org/people/julianne-dalcanton/
 University of Washington Profile
 Video discussion/conversation with Dalcanton and Jennifer Ouellette on Bloggingheads.tv
 The ACS Nearby Galaxy Survey (ANGST)

1968 births
Living people
American women astronomers
University of Washington faculty
Scientists from Pittsburgh